Francis Leroy "Pete" Shields (September 21, 1891 – February 11, 1961) was a Major League Baseball first baseman who played for one season. He played in 23 games for the Cleveland Indians during the 1915 season. Shields attended the University of Mississippi, where he played both football and baseball.

External links

1891 births
1961 deaths
People from Washington County, Mississippi
Major League Baseball first basemen
Cleveland Indians players
Ole Miss Rebels baseball coaches
Baseball players from Mississippi
Portland Beavers players
Charleston Senators players
Waterbury Contenders players
Denver Bears players
Binghamton Bingoes players
Akron Buckeyes players
Newark Bears (IL) players
San Antonio Bears players
Dallas Steers players
All-Southern college football players
Ole Miss Rebels football players
American football halfbacks
Ole Miss Rebels baseball players